This is a list of all presidents of Fenerbahçe, including their occupation.

Presidents

References

Notes

 
Presidents